West Morava is a river in Central Serbia, a 184 km-long headstream of the Great Morava, which it forms with the South Morava. It was known as Brongus in antiquity.

Origin 
The West Morava originates in the Tašti field, east of the town of Požega, from the Golijska Moravica and Đetinja headstreams. Đetinja receives from the left its main tributary, the Skrapež. Less than a kilometer after the confluence, it meets the Golijska Moravica flowing from the south, forming the West Morava. Given the proximity of the confluences of Đetinja, Skrapež and Golijska Moravica, some sources consider all three rivers to be direct headstreams of the West Morava River. Following the direction of the course, the Đetinja is a natural headstream of the West Morava. But, since Golijska Moravica is 23 km longer, the latter is considered as the main headstream. Measured from the source of the Golijska Moravica, the West Morava is 282 km long; the length of the West Morava proper is 184 km.

Course 
Unlike the South and Great Morava's meridian (south-to-north) flow, the West Morava runs in an opposed, latitudinal (west-to-east) direction, dividing the region of Šumadija of the central Serbia from the southern parts of the country.

Due to the West Morava's direction, it flows between many mountains, regions and sub-regions:

 between the regions of Zlatibor (Srbija) to the north and Dragačevo to the south; here it receives the Bjelica from the south and the small town of Lučani, center of Dragačevo, is located in the vicinity, south of the river.
 between the Ovčar (north) and Kablar (south) mountains; the river here carved the Ovčar-Kablar Gorge; the West Morava is dammed in the gorge (which is called Serbian Mount Athos, due to many monasteries) and again right after it, so the artificial Ovčar-Kablar and Međuvršje lakes are formed.
 between the Takovo region (north) and Jelica mountain and Goračići region (south); here is located the town of Čačak, the river is dammed again (Lake Parmenac) and receives many tributaries (mostly from the left: the Čemernica, Bresnička reka, Lađevačka reka); at this point, the river enters the low valley of Zapadno Pomoravlje, meanders and floods often, so from now on the major settlements will be further from the river (Goričani, Lađevci, Mrčajevci).
 between the Kotlenik mountain and the Gruža region (north) and the Stolovi mountains (south); the town of Kraljevo and its suburbs of Adrani and Ratina are located south of the river, where the Ibar empties into the West Morava from the right; also from the right it receives the Tovarnica and from the left, the Gruža.
 between the mountains of Gledićke planine (north) and Goč (south); the most famous Serbian spa, Vrnjačka Banja, its suburbs of Vrnjci and Novo Selo, the industrial town of Trstenik and the monastery of Ljubostinja are located in this section.
 between the regions of Temnić (north) and Rasina (south); several large villages are located north of the river (Medveđa, Velika Drenova, Kukljin, Bošnjane, while the village of Globoder, town of Kruševac and its suburbs of Jasika, Pepeljevac, Parunovac and Čitluk are located south of it. North of the small town of Stalać, the West and Južna Morava meet and form the Great Morava.

Economy 

The West Morava river valley, Zapadno Pomoravlje, is economically the most developed of all three Morava river valleys. With the valley of the Ibar, the West Morava has a huge potential in electricity production (the Ovčar (6 MW) and Međuvršje (7 MW) hydroelectric power plants). Water is also used for the irrigation and for the same purpose the artificial lake Parmenac is created on the river, thus helping the already fertile region (grains, orchards). Also, out of all three Morava rivers, the West Morava's valley is the most forested one.

The watershed of the West Morava is rich in ores, (the Ibar section most of all), and includes the mining of hard coal, magnesite, chromium, etc. As a result, the industry is very developed with a string of heavily industrialized towns: Užice, Požega, Čačak, Kraljevo, Trstenik and Kruševac. The traffic is also important for the economy as the whole of the river valley is a natural route for both the roads and the railways connecting eastern, central and western Serbia.

Characteristics 

Altogether, the West Morava receives 85 tributaries. The river used to be longer (319 km), but due to the regulation of the flow, it is shorter now.

The West Morava has an average discharge of 120 m³/s, but it is characterized by extreme fluctuations, which results in severe floods.

The West Morava drains an area of 15,754 km2 (41.2% of the entire Great Morava watershed), belongs to the Black Sea drainage basin and it is not navigable. When melioration program began in 1966, it was projected that it will become navigable from Kruševac to Čačak.

In the central section of the flow, the special nature reserve Osredak was established in February 2020, and placed under the state protection.

See also 
 List of rivers of Serbia
 Great Morava
 South Morava

Gallery

References 

 Mala Prosvetina Enciklopedija, Third edition (1985); Prosveta; 
 Jovan Đ. Marković (1990): Enciklopedijski geografski leksikon Jugoslavije; Svjetlost-Sarajevo;

External links 
 PIM "Ivan Milutinović", Belgrade, Serbia ; Morava - Vardar (Axios) Navigation Route  (About 1,200 km shorter route (three days shorter time of navigation) from Belgrade to Port of Thessaloniki than across Danube, Black Sea and Aegean Sea. Electric power production, improvement of water quality and regulation of flooding wave.)
 Morava - Vardar (Axios) Navigation Route map
 Hydropower and navigation system "Morava"  (Concepts of regulation of rivers Great Morava and South Morava for navigation and hydropower production.)
 

Rivers of Serbia
Šumadija